"Asylum" is an original BBC Radio 4 audio play written by Anita Sullivan and is a spin-off from the British science fiction television series Torchwood, itself a spin-off from Doctor Who. This episode aired on 1 July 2009 on BBC Radio 4. It stars John Barrowman as Captain Jack Harkness, Eve Myles as Gwen Cooper, Gareth David-Lloyd as Ianto Jones, Tom Price as PC Andy Davidson, and Erin Richards as Freda.

Plot
Andy Davidson comes across a girl in a river as he patrols. As he helps her, the girl screams at him before running off, leaving Andy confused. He comes across the girl again as he attends to a dispute between her and a shopkeeper who claims she shoplifted. The shopkeeper accuses the girl of holding a gun, but when it's revealed to Andy, he notes that it looks more like a radar gun. When the girl is unresponsive, Andy takes her to the police station.

At the Hub, Jack Harkness practices knife throwing while Gwen Cooper has troubles operating the Rift database. While Jack teases Gwen's annoyance at both the database and himself to Ianto Jones, Gwen receives a phone call from Andy regarding the girl.

Jack, Andy and Gwen watch the girl and a police woman talk. The girl is still unresponsive, but via interior monologue, the girl recalls memories of being bullied at school and being called a 'Ghostie'. Jack states that she will go with Torchwood as she and the gun are connected, though Andy protests that she is his case.

As Gwen talks to her, the girl remembers her mother crying. She becomes disorientated as she tells Gwen her name is Freda, and speaks with a Welsh accent. Gwen proceeds to take blood tests while Jack and Ianto return to the Hub with the gun. In the SUV, Jack toys with it and they realise the gun has the power to immobilise security systems and in particular, the traffic. Using a motorbike, Jack and Ianto speed away to the Hub while the city remains gridlocked.

Gwen and Andy take Freda to a safe house while Jack and Ianto run the appropriate tests. Gwen tells Andy that Freda is now Torchwood's responsibility and they're keeping Freda safe. While Gwen attends to a burn on her arm, Freda recalls a house fire as well as a Cardiff address and the name of a woman. She asks to go to the address as it may help jog her memory, and Gwen and Andy argue about the decision.

While Freda bathes, Gwen receives a phone call from the Hub stating that Freda came through the Rift and has the potential to control what comes through. Gwen tells Jack about the address and contact, and Jack warns her to stay focused. At the safe house, Andy pesters Gwen about mentions of the Rift until Freda interrupts them. Gwen decides to give Freda a haircut and clothes to help her blend in while Andy remains in a state of disbelief as he comes to the realisation that Freda is in fact, from the future; as her gun is actually a future form of personal debit machine. In the Hub, Jack's investigation into Freda's contact, Moira Evans draws up the conclusion that she is a resident of the address Freda provided, but doesn't exist. Ianto remarks that Freda's immune system prove that she is not human.

At the safe house, Freda exhibits more signs that her memory is returning as Gwen cuts her hair. Freda tells Gwen that she fell out of the sky after being trapped in a fire. Gwen then tells Freda about the Rift and how she wound up in the river in 2009, instead of her own time, 2069. Jack rings Gwen's phone and upon receiving orders to take Freda back to the Hub, Andy confronts Gwen about Freda's results. Andy chastises Gwen for not letting him know about Torchwood and refuses to let her take Freda into isolation. Gwen blurts out that Freda is an alien, which is followed by Freda jumping out of the window and running away.

As they drive after Freda, Andy relays his disbelief and surprise about Torchwood and what Gwen is involved in. Gwen manages to calm him down enough to make Andy drive sanely. They reach Freda at the address she provided earlier and try to calm her down and bring her in. Freda becomes hysterical toward Andy and Gwen, stating they wanted to imprison her; while Andy misjudges her completely. Freda reveals she is half human, that Moira Evans was her grandmother, and begins to remember the house fire once before exclaiming that people like Gwen and Andy killed her mother.

Jack arrives, ordering Freda to surrender; to which Freda challenges him before using the motorbike to escape once again. Andy suggests he drive and the three of them chase after Freda. In the car, Gwen and Jack discuss ways of subduing Freda, with use of grenades and stun guns. Horrified, Andy abruptly stops the car and chastises the both of them for treating Freda like a monster. Jack remarks that she is an alien on the run, but Andy points out that Freda is also half human and the only reason she's running is because she is scared and people like Jack and Gwen are planning on shooting her. He asks to speak with her first before they use the stun gun, and Jack reluctantly agrees.

They reach the river where Freda came from, and Andy finds Freda about to jump off a bridge. Andy tells her he's sorry about her mother and that he feels alienated like she does some of the time and that makes them both equal, no matter their species. Andy helps Freda back over the edge and they return to the Hub. Freda explains to Gwen that her grandmother's species sought refuge on Earth and that the memories of the fire are too much for her to remember. She tells Gwen she was saved by a man who opened a space for her in the roof. Gwen offers to retcon her so she can start anew, but Freda denies it; stating she doesn't want to forget her mother entirely. Gwen asks Freda the name of the man who saved her from the fire, to which Freda drowsily replies 'Torchwood', before falling asleep.

Gwen returns to the group and Andy offers to sit in with Freda. Gwen explains Freda's story to the others and Jack is still adamant in isolating her as her future knowledge is too dangerous. Ianto remarks that Jack is being hypocritical and that perhaps the future Torchwood has sent Freda to them for their benefit. Gwen and Ianto come to the realisation that they need to take responsibility for the good things that come through the Rift, like Freda and prompt Jack to introduce an asylum policy.

As Andy sits in with Freda, she awakens suddenly, asking for her mother. Andy calms her down and gets her back to sleep after explaining she's had a bad dream. He promises her that she will be fine, and Freda's closing monologue describes her fall into sleep as calm, and not being alone.

References
Torchwood Website
Torchwood Radio Play
Torchwood Radio Play – Asylum
Anita Sullivan UK Playwright

Radio plays based on Torchwood
2009 radio dramas
2009 audio plays